Maria Perpetua Concepcion Del Rosario-Escudero (born December 8, 1975), professionally known as Connie Sison, is a Filipino broadcast journalist, reporter, host and news anchor. She is best known for being the news anchor of Balitanghali on GMA News TV now (GTV), being one of the hosts of GMA Network's morning show Unang Hirit, and  Pinoy M.D.. She also hosts the radio version of Pinoy M.D., Pinoy M.D. sa Dobol B that airs on DZBB. Her hosting skills in Pinoy M.D. got her a Bantog award for Media Practitioner in Television given by Department of Science and Technology in 2018.

Television career
In 1997, Sison's first job was being a field reporter at Studio 23 (now ABS-CBN Sports and Action), ABS-CBN's sister network owned by ABS-CBN Corporation, and SNN (later rebranded as ANC). ABS-CBN promoted her after 8 months and she became a reporter for hard news in TV Patrol. Later on, Sison became an anchor of  La Niña Watch, a program that focused on climate change, and she was also included in Hoy Gising!, ABS-CBN's public service show.

In 2001, Sison was included in ABS-CBN's morning program Alas Singko Y Medya as one of the show's hosts. Sison also hosted a reality television program called Kakasa Ka Ba? that she co-hosted with JV Villar. In 2006, she exited ABS-CBN through a retirement package. Sison moved to RPN 9 in the same year while awaiting for her non-compete clause to end. The only considered rival network of ABS-CBN at that time was GMA Network. Sison anchored evening newscast NewsWatch Aksyon Balita with Erwin Tulfo and Aljo Bendijo as their co-anchors for a year.

In 2007, as soon as her non-compete clause contract ended in ABS-CBN, Sison continued her career in GMA Network. She was entrust to do several news and current affairs shows in GMA's main channel and its secondary network, Q Channel 11, which was later rebranded as GMA News TV and currently GTV. Among those shows were DoQmentaries (a monthly documentary program), News on Q, On Call: Siksik Sa Impormasyon. Bilis na Pag-Aksyon, and Balitanghali (a late morning newscast on GMA News TV and GTV which she co-hosted with Raffy Tima). In GMA's main channel, she is one of the hosts of the morning program Unang Hirit. She also hosts the medical-focused show Pinoy M.D., which got a radio version in DZBB (GMA's flagship radio station) and officially titled as Pinoy M.D. sa Dobol B.

In 2018, she is the very first recipient of the Bantog award for Media Practitioner in Television given by Department of Science and Technology as a result of her hosting of Pinoy M.D. She was also rewarded with a P 100,000 cash, which she opted to give to the Kapuso Foundation as a donation. In 2020, her professionalism in her work was tested when she interviewed Senator Richard Gordon and she was unpleasantly interrupted by Gordon in the midst of the interview. Despite the situation, Sison remained calm and some netizens condemned Gordon's actions as being rude and lauded Sison's composure.

In 2023, she announced she will retire hosting Unang Hirit after 13 years to focus on her family and health, while she retains anchoring Balitanghali, and as a host of Pinoy MD and two of DZBB shows (Pinoy MD sa Super Radyo DZBB, and as a co-host of Arnold Clavio on One on One: Walang Personalan).

Personal life 
Connie Sison was born as Maria Perpetua Concepcion Del Rosario on December 8, 1975, in Pasig, Philippines. She attended Maryknoll College during her elementary years. In college, she took up BS Psychology in Miriam College and graduated. Aside from being a broadcast journalist, she does painting as a hobby. She is married to entrepreneur Christopher James Escudero and they have three daughters. Filipino actor Martin del Rosario is her nephew (Martin's father is Connie's older brother, Robert del Rosario).

Sison was diagnosed with hypothyroidism and tried to confront the disease through doing exercise and proper diet.

References

External links
 Connie Sison

1975 births
Living people
Filipino television news anchors
ABS-CBN personalities
ABS-CBN News and Current Affairs people
RPN News and Public Affairs people
GMA Network personalities
GMA Integrated News and Public Affairs people
People from Pasig
Miriam College alumni
Women television journalists
People with endocrine, nutritional and metabolic diseases